The Singapore Assault Rifle 80 (SAR 80) is a conventional assault rifle from Singapore.

History and development
In the late 1960s, the Singapore Armed Forces (SAF) adopted the AR-15 as their main service rifle. Due to difficulties in obtaining the rifles from the United States, the Singaporean government purchased a license to domestically manufacture the M16 rifle, which was then designated the M16S1. However, the domestic rifle requirements were not sufficient to allow Chartered Industries of Singapore (CIS, now Singapore Technologies Kinetics) to economically maintain operations at its rifle factory.  Export sales of the M16S1 were not a viable option.  Due to the requirements of the license agreement, CIS had to request permission from Colt and the US State Department to allow any export sale, which they rarely granted.

In the early 1970s, Sterling Armaments Company engineers had developed their own 5.56 mm rifle design, the Light Automatic Rifle (LAR), but this had been shelved when Sterling acquired a manufacturing licence for the US-designed Armalite AR-18 assault rifle. While Sterling could not legally sublicense the AR-18, their AR-18 derived Sterling Assault Rifle (SAR) was available. This was based on a refined version of the Light Automatic Rifle, fitted with an AR-18 trigger group. Sterling licensed the SAR design to CIS, who put it into production as the SAR 80. 

The successor to this weapon is the SR-88.

Users

: Seen in the hands of Central African Gendarmerie.
: Croatian Army.
: Papua New Guinea Defence Force.
: Slovenian Army.
: Somalia received SAR 80s during the 1980s. Most seen in the Middle East, heavily modified by various forces fighting in the region.

 
 Some used by Democratic Forces for the Liberation of Rwanda in Democratic Republic of Congo

See also
SA80
Leader Dynamics Series T2 MK5
Heckler & Koch G36
List of assault rifles

References

External links
Modern Firearms
Sterling Assault Rifle

5.56×45mm NATO assault rifles
Assault rifles of Singapore